Developmental administration of Tamil Nadu is carried out by Panchayat Unions or blocks in rural areas of Tamil Nadu, a southern state of India.  These panchayat unions have a set of panchayat villages under them.  In urban areas, the governance is done by municipal corporations, municipalities or town panchayats based on the size of the town.

The revenue administration, in contrast is carried out by the Revenue divisions and Taluks.  These administrative units are classified based on the district.  There are 38 districts in Tamil Nadu and for revenue administration purposes, each district is divided into divisions, which are further divided to Taluks.  Each of these Taluks have a list of revenue villages under them. Tahsildar is the head of these Taluks.

Developmental administration
The below list provides the list of blocks in each district

See also
 Districts of Tamil Nadu
 Government of Tamil Nadu
 List of revenue divisions of Tamil Nadu

References

Developmental administrative units
Developmental administrative units